, known mononymously as Mina, is an American-born Japanese singer and dancer based in South Korea. She is one of the three Japanese members of the South Korean girl group Twice, formed by JYP Entertainment in 2015.

Early life
Mina was born on March 24, 1997, in San Antonio, Texas, U.S, to Japanese parents Sachiko (née Terao) and Akira Myoi. She moved to Japan as a toddler and grew up in Nishinomiya, Hyōgo Prefecture, Japan. Her father is an orthopedic surgeon at Osaka University Hospital in Suita. She has one brother named Kai, who is five years older than her. Mina trained in ballet from a young age, having practiced it for eleven years before debuting with Twice. She attended Obayashi Sacred Heart School in Takarazuka, Hyōgo until 2013. She did not graduate because she moved to Korea to become a trainee.

In 2017, it was reported that Mina held dual Japanese and American citizenship.  However, as of 2019, she no longer holds U.S. citizenship, as confirmed by the Quarterly Publication of Individuals Who Have Chosen to Expatriate list published by the U.S. Internal Revenue Service.

Career

Pre-debut
Mina was shopping with her mother in Osaka when she was approached and offered an audition by a recruiter from JYP Entertainment. She moved to South Korea in January 2014 to become a trainee at JYP Entertainment. In 2015, Mina participated in the South Korean reality television show Sixteen, created by JYP Entertainment and co-produced by Mnet. As one of nine successful participants, she went on to join the newly formed girl group Twice.

Debut with Twice, health issues and MiSaMo

In October 2015, Mina officially debuted as a member of Twice with the release of their first extended play, The Story Begins. Its lead single "Like Ooh-Ahh" was the first K-pop debut song to reach 100 million views on YouTube.

On July 11, 2019, JYP Entertainment announced that Mina would sit out the remainder of the Twicelights World Tour due to her extreme anxiety and insecurity regarding onstage performances. She was later diagnosed with an anxiety disorder. In February 2020, it was reported that Mina's condition had improved and that she was ready to return to performing live with Twice.

On February 9, 2023, JYP announced that Mina, alongside bandmates Sana and Momo, will officially debut in Japan on July 26 as a sub-unit named MiSaMo with an extended play of six tracks. Prior to the trio's debut, on January 25, they released the track “Bouquet” as part of the soundtrack of TV Asahi’s drama series Liaison: Children’s Heart Clinic.

Public image
Since her debut, Mina has been recognized as one of Twice's strongest dancers in both South Korea and abroad. The Chosun Ilbo credits her popularity with helping improve relations between Japan and South Korea. In Gallup Korea's annual music poll of 2019, she was voted the 20th most popular idol in South Korea.

Endorsements
In early 2022, Mina was announced as the new muse of the popular South Korean luxury fashion brand Metrocity. In March of the same year, she was announced as the global brand ambassador of SK-II, Japan's leading cosmetic brand.

Discography

Soundtrack appearances

Songwriting credits
All song credits are adapted from the Korea Music Copyright Association's database unless stated otherwise.

Filmography

Television shows

Bibliography

Photobooks

References

External links
 

1997 births
Living people
21st-century Japanese women singers
21st-century Japanese singers
Japanese ballerinas
Japanese female dancers
Japanese dance musicians
Japanese expatriates in South Korea
Japanese K-pop singers
Japanese women pop singers
Japanese-language singers
JYP Entertainment artists
Korean-language singers of Japan
K-pop singers
Japanese Roman Catholics
Musicians from Kobe
Musicians from San Antonio
People from Nishinomiya
Former United States citizens
Reality show winners
Twice (group) members